The Perfect Lady is a 1931 British comedy film directed by Frederick J. Jackson and Milton Rosmer and starring Moira Lynd, Henry Wilcoxon and Reginald Gardiner. It was made at Elstree Studios by British International Pictures.

Cast
 Moira Lynd as Anne Burnett  
 Henry Wilcoxon as Larry Tindale  
 Reginald Gardiner as Lord Tony Carderay  
 Betty Amann as Jacqueline Dubarry  
 Athene Seyler as Lady Westhaven  
 Frederick Lloyd as Lord Westhaven

References

Bibliography
 Low, Rachael. Filmmaking in 1930s Britain. George Allen & Unwin, 1985.
 Wood, Linda. British Films, 1927-1939. British Film Institute, 1986.

External links

1931 films
British comedy films
1931 comedy films
Films directed by Milton Rosmer
Films shot at British International Pictures Studios
British black-and-white films
1930s English-language films
1930s British films